Fox Township is one of eleven townships in Jasper County, Illinois, USA.  As of the 2010 census, its population was 512 and it contained 205 housing units.

Geography

Unincorporated towns
 Boos at 
 West Liberty at 
(This list is based on USGS data and may include former settlements.)

Adjacent townships
 Willow Hill Township (northeast)
 Sainte Marie Township (east)
 Preston Township, Richland County (south)
 Denver Township, Richland County (southwest)
 Smallwood Township (west)
 Wade Township (northwest)

Cemeteries
The township contains this cemetery: Bethel(Quaker)

Major highways
  Illinois Route 130

Demographics

School districts
 East Richland Community Unit School District 1
 Jasper County Community Unit School District 1

Political districts
 Illinois' 19th congressional district
 State House District 108
 State Senate District 54

References
 
 United States Census Bureau 2007 TIGER/Line Shapefiles
 United States National Atlas

External links
 City-Data.com
 Illinois State Archives

Townships in Jasper County, Illinois
Townships in Illinois